The Logistics Performance Index (LPI) is an interactive benchmarking tool created by the World Bank to help countries identify the challenges and opportunities they face in their performance on trade logistics and what they can do to improve their performance. It is the weighted average of the country scores on six key dimensions: customs performance, infrastructure quality, ease of arranging shipments, logistics services quality, consignments tracking and tracing and timeliness of shipments. This measure indicates the relative ease and efficiency with which products can be moved into and inside a country. Germany and Sweden are the most efficient and highest ranked LPI countries as per the 2018 LPI.

The Logistics Performance Index was reported by the World Bank every two years from 2010 to 2018. As of 2023 no new data has been published. The LPI is based on a worldwide survey of stakeholders on the ground providing feedback on the logistics "friendliness" of the countries in which they operate and those with which they trade. They combine in-depth knowledge of the countries in which they operate with informed qualitative assessments of other countries where they trade and have experience of global logistics environment.
 
LPI results have been used in many policy reports and documents prepared by multilateral organizations and findings from the index provide a worldwide general benchmark for the
logistics industry and for logistics users. LPI results have also been embraced by the academic community.

Understanding what comprises the index
The logistics performance (LPI) is the weighted average of the country scores on six key dimensions:
 The efficiency of the clearance process (i.e; speed, simplicity and predictability of formalities) by border control agencies, including customs.
 Quality of trade and transport-related infrastructure (e.g., ports, railroads, roads, information technology);
 Ease of arranging competitively priced shipments;
 Competence and quality of logistics services (e.g., transport operators, customs brokers);
 Ability to track and trace consignments;
 Timeliness of shipments in reaching the destination within the scheduled or expected delivery time.

Top 10 LPI countries  
Full listing by country is available on The World Bank website.

2018 Logistics Performance Index

World Bank has recently come out with the Logistics Performance Index 2018 (released every two years). Germany again leads the table as #1 with an LPI score of 4.20. Followed by Sweden, Belgium, Austria and Japan in that order of top 5 Nations. The LPI scores of high-income countries are 48% higher than in lower-income countries. Logistics is a $4.3 trillion industry globally. It is the backbone of trade, and good logistics can reduce trade cost and make countries compete globally. Getting logistics right means improving infrastructure, skills, customs and regulations, policies and governance at the right proportion. India's rank fell from 35 in 2016 to 44 in the 2018 ranking.

2016 Logistics Performance Index 
 
In the 2016 LPI, the top position is held by Germany (LPI score of 4.23). Civil war-inflicted Syria holds the last position (LPI score of 1.60). India’s ranking jumped from 54 in 2014 to 35 in 2016 whereas its score also improved from 3.08 in 2014 to 3.42 in 2016.

Controversy 
Several studies have noted that, due to the nature of the methodology of the LPI, where it is comprised out of subjective answers of different logistics operators, it tends to be skewed and undervalues some countries with a statistically better logistics system. Moreover, studies have shown that the LPI is much more influenced by social, rather than economic factors.

References

World Bank
Freight transport
International rankings